Changhua BLL (Chinese: 彰化柏力力) is a basketball team based in Changhua, Taiwan. They have been part of the Super Basketball League since the 2023 season.

History 
On July 11, 2022, the Taoyuan Pauian Archiland announced that they will rent their playing spot in the Super Basketball League to the Changhua Basketball Committee for the following two seasons. They also took over the remaining contracts of the Taoyuan Pauian Archiland players. On July 15, the team announced the team name Changhua BLL. The team selected Chiang Shang-Chien with the first overall pick of the 2022 SBL draft, making Chiang the first UBA Division II player ever to be selected by the first overall pick in SBL draft history.

Roster

Head coaches

Season-by-season record

References

External links

Super Basketball League teams
2022 establishments in Taiwan
basketball teams established in 2022
Sport in Changhua